The Mount Brown Fire Lookout in Glacier National Park is significant as one of a chain of staffed fire lookout posts within the park. The low two-story timber-construction structure with a pyramidal roof was built in 1928. The design was a standard U.S. Forest Service plan.

See also
 
 National Register of Historic Places listings in Flathead County, Montana
 National Register of Historic Places listings in Glacier National Park

References

External links

Government buildings completed in 1928
Towers completed in 1928
Fire lookout towers on the National Register of Historic Places in Montana
Rustic architecture in Montana
1928 establishments in Montana
National Register of Historic Places in Flathead County, Montana
National Register of Historic Places in Glacier National Park